Jeffrey Clark Wadlow (born March 2, 1976) is an American writer, producer and director.  Feature films that he has both written and directed include Truth or Dare, Kick-Ass 2 and Fantasy Island.

Life and career 
Wadlow was born in Arlington, Virginia, the son of Emily Couric, a state senator, and R. Clark Wadlow. His mother's sister is journalist Katie Couric. He has a sister, Dr. Anne Drogula, who teaches Latin at Ohio University. Wadlow attended Dartmouth College, graduating with a BA in History and Film modified by Drama and a citation for outstanding work in Animation. The following year, he attended the University of Southern California School of Cinema-Television after being Awarded a USC Associates Endowment Scholarship for academic achievement, Wadlow went on to graduate in 2001. While there, he made The Tower of Babble (2002), which he conceived, co-wrote, acted in and directed. He received more than two dozen awards for the short, including Best Short Film at the New York International Independent Film & Video Festival and at the St. Louis International Film Festival, the George Méliès Cinematography Award at the Taos Talking Picture Festival, and a Student Award at USA Film Festival.

He went on to receive the Short Film Prize at the Wine Country Film Festival for Manual Labor (2002) and the Best Animated Short at the New Haven Film Fest for Catching Kringle (2004). Having won the short film division at the 2002 Chrysler Million Dollar Film Competition for Living the Lie (2002), he aspired to enter the competition with a feature film.

In 2005, Wadlow and Beau Bauman came up with the idea for Wadlow's theatrical directorial debut Cry Wolf with the money Wadlow won in the 2002 Chrysler Million Dollar Film Competition for his short film, Living the Lie. Along with co-writer Beau Bauman, created a five-minute presentation piece starring Topher Grace and Estella Warren that won a top prize at the Toronto Film Festival.

As an actor, he has played a small role in Pearl Harbor  and a professor on an episode of the sci-fi TV series Roswell, which aired May 7, 2001.
Wadlow also founded The Adrenaline Film Project, a program to help aspiring filmmakers of all ages conceive and complete a short film in just 72 hours.

He directed the film Never Back Down, which was released on March 14, 2008, and starred Djimon Hounsou and Sean Faris. The movie went on to beat out big budget competition to win the MTV movie award for "Best Fight." Wadlow also wrote and directed Kick-Ass 2, the sequel to the 2010 black comedy superhero film Kick-Ass.

Filmography

Short films

Feature films

Television

Acting roles

Other credits

References

External links

American film directors
American male screenwriters
American film producers
Living people
American people of French descent
American people of German-Jewish descent
1973 births
Horror film directors
People from Arlington County, Virginia